Antonio "Kito" Correia (born 22 October 1983) is an Angolan football striker who last played for Ajax Cape Town.

Career
Correia left Angola and the civil war for the Netherlands and tried to make a career in SC Heerenveen. His family members had been killed in the war. He debuted in the Eredivisie in April 2003, when he came in as a substitute for Georgios Samaras.

Just after his debut season, he was approached by an agent who told that Benfica was keen to sign him. He was sure that the move was real and didn't show up in Heerenveen for a while. His Dutch club decided to end his contract. Benfica didn't sign him and he had to go to play in a lower league for FC Emmen. He had problems also in Emmen and he decided to back to Angola, where the war had ended.

In 2006, he played for Primeiro de Agosto in the Angolan league. For the season 2008, he was invited for a test period for FC Inter Turku where his former teammate Jos Hooiveld played. He got a two-year contract with the Finnish club. In his first season, he suffered an injury and could play only in 5 matches of the season. His contract expired in December 2009.

On 1 September 2011 he signed a two-year contract at South African outfit Ajax Cape Town. He was recommended by his former coach Foppe de Haan.

References

External links
 Prifile on FCInter.com
 Correia's stats on Veikkausliiga.com
 www.ronaldzwiers.com: Antonio Correia
 Worst Foreign Striker – Antonio ‘Keto’ Correia

1983 births
Living people
Angolan footballers
Association football forwards
Eredivisie players
Eerste Divisie players
Veikkausliiga players
South African Premier Division players
SC Heerenveen players
FC Emmen players
FC Inter Turku players
C.D. Primeiro de Agosto players
Cape Town Spurs F.C. players
Be Quick '28 players
Angolan expatriate footballers
Expatriate footballers in the Netherlands
Expatriate footballers in Finland
Expatriate soccer players in South Africa
People from Malanje Province